Harry Jerome “Jay” Barker (born July 20, 1972) is a former professional American football quarterback. He is currently a Birmingham radio personality.

Football career 
Barker attended Hewitt-Trussville High School in Trussville, Alabama, where his football career began. He graduated in 1990.

Barker played college football at the University of Alabama, under head coach Gene Stallings. In the final game of the 1992 season, Barker led the Crimson Tide to a national championship by defeating the #1 Miami Hurricanes, 34–13, in the 1993 Sugar Bowl. In the 1994 season, Barker won the Johnny Unitas Golden Arm Award and finished fifth in the voting for the Heisman Trophy. Barker led the Crimson Tide to a 35–2–1 record as their starting quarterback, which was the NCAA record for most wins for a college quarterback at that time. However, the official NCAA record book reflects a 27–11 mark due to later forfeiture of games during the 1993 season.

Barker was drafted in the 1995 NFL Draft in the fifth round by the Green Bay Packers, but did not make the team. Subsequently, Barker was on the roster of the New England Patriots and the Carolina Panthers, but never played in a regular season game.

In 1998, the Toronto Argonauts signed Barker, bringing him to the Canadian Football League.

After three seasons with the Argonauts, Barker left to join the Birmingham Thunderbolts in the XFL. A fan favorite of the Bolts' (generally small) crowds, Barker was the team's second-string quarterback and played several games in the middle of the season before suffering a career-ending concussion late. In contrast to his college career, his time in the XFL saw him oversee the beginning of a seven-game losing streak.

Radio career 
Barker is currently an analyst for ESPN Radio, and formerly an on-air personality for WJOX in Birmingham. Both he and Al Del Greco, a former Auburn placekicker, hosted the Opening Drive program on WJOX, along with Tony Kurre until 2018.

Personal life
From 1995 to 2007 he was married to Amy DiGiovanna. The couple has four children.
  
In 2008, Barker married American country musician Sara Evans. They live in Mountain Brook, Alabama, a suburb of Birmingham with his four children and Evans' three children.

On January 15, 2022, Barker was arrested on domestic violence charges after he allegedly tried to hit his wife, Sara Evans, and another individual, with his car. The report also indicated that Barker and Evans are currently separated. Evans filed for divorce in August 2021 citing "irreconcilable differences and inappropriate marital conduct".

References

External links 
 Jay Barker at NFL.com

1972 births
Living people
American football quarterbacks
American radio personalities
Players of Canadian football from Birmingham, Alabama
Alabama Crimson Tide football players
Alabama Republicans
Birmingham Thunderbolts players
Canadian football quarterbacks
Carolina Panthers players
Green Bay Packers players
New England Patriots players
Toronto Argonauts players
People from Mountain Brook, Alabama
People from Trussville, Alabama
Players of American football from Birmingham, Alabama